Jaber Hagawi is a Saudi Arabian football player.

External links
 
 
 
 slstat.com Profile

1981 births
Living people
Saudi Arabian footballers
Al-Qadsiah FC players
Al-Fateh SC players
Al-Jubail Club players
Al-Shoulla FC players
Al Safa FC players
Al-Noor FC players
Saudi First Division League players
Saudi Professional League players
Saudi Second Division players
Saudi Fourth Division players
Association football defenders
Saudi Arabia international footballers